Dickasonia is a genus of flowering plants from the orchid family, Orchidaceae. There is only one known species, Dickasonia vernicosa, which is native to the Himalayas from Darjeeling, through Bhutan and Assam to Myanmar.

See also 
 List of Orchidaceae genera

References 

Berg Pana, H. 2005. Handbuch der Orchideen-Namen. Dictionary of Orchid Names. Dizionario dei nomi delle orchidee. Ulmer, Stuttgart
Pridgeon, A.M., Cribb, P.J., Chase, M.C. & Rasmussen, F.N. (2006) Epidendroideae (Part One). Genera Orchidacearum 4: 56ff. Oxford University Press.

External links 

IOSPE orchid photos
Marni Turkel, Mostly Species Orchids and Flasks (Santa Rosa California USA), Dickasonia vernicosa outcross
Terragalleria studio photo
Au Jardin de Minique, Dickasonia

Coelogyninae
Monotypic Epidendroideae genera
Arethuseae genera
Orchids of India
Flora of Assam (region)
Flora of East Himalaya
Flora of Myanmar